Robert Adams (born May 8, 1937) is an American photographer who has focused on the changing landscape of the American West. His work first came to prominence in the mid-1970s through his book The New West (1974) and his participation in the exhibition New Topographics: Photographs of a Man-Altered Landscape in 1975. He has received two Guggenheim Fellowships, a MacArthur Fellowship, the Deutsche Börse Photography Prize and the Hasselblad Award.

Early life and education 
Robert Hickman Adams was born on May 8, 1937, in Orange, New Jersey to Lois Hickman Adams and Ross Adams. In 1940 the family moved to Madison, New Jersey where his younger sister Carolyn was born. Then in 1947 they moved to Madison, Wisconsin for five years, where he contracted polio at age 12 in 1949 in his back, left arm, and hand but was able to recover. They moved one last time, in 1952, to Wheat Ridge, Colorado, a suburb of Denver, when his father secured a job in Denver. They moved to Colorado partly because of the chronic bronchial problems that he suffered from in Madison, New Jersey around age 5 as an attempt to help alleviate those problems. He continued to suffer from asthma and allergy problems.
National Gallery of Art, Washington, D.C.
Philadelphia Museum of Art, Philadelphia, PA

Awards 
1973: Guggenheim Fellowship from the John Simon Guggenheim Memorial Foundation.
1973: Photographer's Fellowship from the National Endowment for the Arts.
1978: Photographer's Fellowship from the National Endowment for the Arts.
1980: Guggenheim Fellowship from the John Simon Guggenheim Memorial Foundation.
1982: Peer Award from The Friends of Photography, San Francisco.
1987: Charles Pratt Memorial Award.
1994: MacArthur Fellowship from the MacArthur Foundation.
1995: Spectrum International Prize for Photography from the Foundation of Lower Saxony.
2006: Deutsche Börse Photography Prize for the exhibition Turning Back at Haus der Kunst, Munich, Germany.
2009: Hasselblad Award
2014: Elected to American Academy of Arts and Letters
2020: Induction into the International Photography Hall of Fame and Museum.

References

External links 
  – hosted at the Yale University Art Gallery site
 Adams at Masters of Photography
 Adams photographs taken at twilight, as shown at the Victoria and Albert Museum

1937 births
Living people
People from Madison, New Jersey
People from Orange, New Jersey
Fine art photographers
Landscape photographers
Artists of the American West
MacArthur Fellows
20th-century American photographers
21st-century American photographers
New Topographics photographers
Members of the American Academy of Arts and Letters